is a Japanese 3DCG animation studio.

Polygon has animated a wide variety of content, from commercials for Shiseido featuring the studio's original penguin characters , to the 3D CG anime television series Digital Tokoro-san and the 3DCG anime film Samuroid Zero.

In 2004, PPI contributed the 3DCG parts for Production I.G's Mamoru Oshii-directed Innocence, the second feature anime film of the Ghost in the Shell universe, as well as his subsequent film, The Sky Crawlers.

In 2012, Hasbro's full-CG television series Transformers Prime, for which PPI created the animation, was awarded "Outstanding Special Class Animated Program" at the 30th Annual Daytime Emmy Awards.

Polygon Pictures also created the animation for the Disney XD series Tron: Uprising, as well as several episodes of the hit show Star Wars: The Clone Wars, broadcast on Cartoon Network. Each of these series received 4 nominations respectively at the 2013 Annie Awards, with Tron taking home awards for Character Design and Production Design.

In 2021, Polygon Pictures established an Indian subsidiary Polygon Pictures India in Thane, Maharashtra.

Works

Films
Ultraman Cosmos 2: The Blue Planet (2002)
Ape Escape The Movie: Battle for the Golden Pipo Helmet (2002)
Mini-Moni the Movie: Okashi na Daibōken! (2002)
Ultraman Cosmos vs. Ultraman Justice: The Final Battle (2003; co-production with Tsuburaya Productions)
Ghost in the Shell 2: Innocence (2004, 3DCG for Production I.G; co-production with Studio Ghibli)
Valiant (2005; character modeling and setup, co-production with Vanguard Animation)
Happily N'Ever After (2007; hair setups, co-produced with Vanguard Animation)
Care Bears: Oopsy Does It! (2007; character modeling and setup)
The Sky Crawlers (2008, 3DCG for Production I.G)
Oblivion Island: Haruka and the Magic Mirror (2009)
Higanjima (2010)
Kiiroi Zou (2013)
Transformers Prime Beast Hunters: Predacons Rising (2013)
Knights of Sidonia: The Movie (2015)
Ajin Trilogy
Ajin Part 1: Shōdō (2015)
Ajin Part 2: Shōtotsu (2016)
Ajin Part 3: Shōgeki (2016)
Blame! (2017)
Godzilla Trilogy
Godzilla: Planet of the Monsters (2017)
Godzilla: City on the Edge of Battle (2018)
Godzilla: The Planet Eater (2018)
Human Lost (2019)
Knights of Sidonia: Love Woven in the Stars (2021)
Eiga Estab Life: Revengers' Road (2023)

Television series
Music Fantasy Dream (1992; "Golliwog's Cakewalk" and "Air on the G String")
Minna no Uta (1999/2004; "Walking!" and "Hello Again, JoJo")
Mr. Digital Tokoro (2000–2001)
Peek-a-Boo! (2001–2014; animated sequences)
Genki Genki Nontan (2002–2006)
Random! Cartoons (2006; "BoneHeads")
My Friends Tigger & Pooh (2007–2010, co-produced by Disney Television Animation)
Star Wars: The Clone Wars (2011–2013)
Transformers Prime (2010–2013)
Tron: Uprising (2012–2013)
Knights of Sidonia (2014–2015)
Ronia, the Robber's Daughter (2014–2015, co-produced by Studio Ghibli)
Disney's Tsum Tsum (2014)
Transformers: Robots in Disguise (2015–2017) 
Ajin: Demi-Human (2016)
Lost in Oz (2016–2018)
Pingu in the City (2017–2019, with Dandelion Animation Studio)
Fist of the Blue Sky: Regenesis (2018)
Star Wars Resistance (2018–2020)
Big Hero 6: The Series (2019; "Baymax and Mochi" shorts)
Show by Rock!! Mashumairesh!! (2020; 3DCG production for Kinema Citrus)
Plaza Effect (2020)
Stillwater (2020-present)
Estab Life: Great Escape (2022)
Love, Death & Robots, Volume III - "The Very Pulse of the Machine" (2022)Kaina of the Great Snow Sea (2023)The Idolmaster Shiny Colors (2024)

OVAsVideo Pioneer (1984–1987)Ajin: Demi-Human (2016–2017)

ONAsLevius (2019)Drifting Dragons (2020)Transformers: War for Cybertron Trilogy (2020–2021, co-produced by Allspark Animation and Rooster Teeth)Pacific Rim: The Black (2021–22; co-produced by Legendary Television)Mech Cadets (2023; co-produced by Netflix Animation and Boom! Studios)

Ride Films & ShowsDark Chapel Tokyo Joypolis amusement park (2004)Expo 2005: Open Your Mind (2005)Galaxy Express 999 Epson Shinagawa Aqua Stadium (2005)DigitaReal Live Stage Tokyo Joypolis amusement park (2012 Projection mapping)Caretta Illumination 2012"Lumière no Mori (Forest of Light)" Caretta Shiodome (2012 Projection mapping)

GamesSuper Power League (1993; box art)Super Power League 2 (1994; box art)Onimusha 2 (2002 Capcom video game)Winning Eleven Tactics (2003 Konami video game; opening video animation)Fatal Frame III: The Tormented (2005)Dead or Alive 4 (2006) (ending cinematics of the Hayate and Erena)Dead or Alive Xtreme 2 (2006) (character introduction videos)
 Fighting Action Girl Cortina(2006)KOF: Maximum Impact 2 (2006)Street Fighter IV (2009 Capcom video game; opening video animation)Monster Farm Lagoon (2009)Resident Evil 5 (2009)Metroid: Other M (2010 Nintendo video game)Marvel vs. Capcom 3: Fate of Two Worlds (2010; trailer)Street Fighter X Tekken (2012 Capcom video game; opening video animation)Dino Dominion (2012-2014 COLOPL Android application game)Lollipop Chainsaw (2012 Kadokawa Games)Sacred 3 (2014 Deep Silver)Sengoku Kabuki Do (2013-2014 COLOPL Android application game)Thief (2014 Square Enix & Eidos-Montréal)Street Fighter V (2016 Capcom video game; character designs, background designs, opening movie, trailer movie, promotional video and character illustrations)Onmyoji (2018 NetEase video game; animated promotional video)Pokémon: Let's Go, Pikachu! and Let's Go, Eevee! (2018)Pokémon Sword and Shield (2019)Granblue Fantasy: Relink (TBA)

WebNissan X Dwarf: PLUG, OUR NeW WORLD  (2011 "The Planet Zero" Movie Theater)

Short filmsIn Search of New Axis (1989)In Search of Muscular Axis (1990)In Search of Performing Axis (1991)Michael the Dinosaur (1993)Virtual Circus (1995)The Electric Circus (1996)The Robot Circus (1996)the FLY BanD! (1998) (for Information-technology Promotion Agency and exa)Aerobot (1998)Pole Network (1998)Junk Food King (1998)Polygon Family (1998) (for Information-technology Promotion Agency)Crocotires'' (1999) (for Information-technology Promotion Agency)

Commercials
Sony (1990)
Mainichi Broadcasting System (1992)
NHK Hi-Vision (1992)
Bigrill (1994)
HG Super Hard (6 commercials; 1995–1997)
Yamato Home Convenience (2 commercials; 2005)
Wowow (2007)
BS Fuji (2008)
Kodansha (2016)

References

External links
 
 

 
Animation studios in Tokyo
Japanese animation studios
Mass media companies established in 1983
Japanese companies established in 1983
Minato, Tokyo